Bould is a hamlet in Idbury civil parish, Oxfordshire, about  southeast of Stow-on-the-Wold in neighbouring Gloucestershire.

External links

Villages in Oxfordshire
West Oxfordshire District